Thomas Buitink (born 14 June 2000) is a Dutch professional footballer who plays as a forward for Fortuna Sittard, on loan from Vitesse.

Club career

Vitesse
Buitink first joined Vitesse in 2010, from local side Veensche Boys. He made his first-team debut during Vitesse's 3–1 home victory against Feyenoord on 11 February 2018, replacing Luc Castaignos in the 80th minute.

On 31 October 2018, Buitink scored his first goal in professional football. In the last minute of a KNVB Cup match against Heracles Almelo, he decided the 0–2 end result. His first goal in the Eredivisie followed on 2 March 2019. On that day, manager Leonid Slutsky allowed him to come on for Mohammed Dauda against NAC Breda after thirty-three minutes, as NAC were leading 0–1 after a goal by Giovanni Korte. Buitink scored the equaliser nine minutes after the break and Vitesse ultimately won 4–1 thanks to goals from Maikel van der Werff, Alexander Büttner and Matúš Bero. Buitink was allowed to start in for the first time in an Eredivisie match against ADO Den Haag on 30 March 2019. ADO managed to score three goals in total via Sheraldo Becker and Lex Immers twice, but Buitink saved a 3–3 draw with a hat-trick.

During the 2019–20 season, Buitink did not score for Vitesse in competition. In January 2021, he sent on a six-month loan to PEC Zwolle. Four days after his move, he was allowed to start against Heracles Almelo. That team went into halftime with a lead thanks to goals from Lucas Schoofs and Delano Burgzorg. Five minutes after the break, Buitink assisted Virgil Misidjan's goal. Coach John Stegeman substituted Buitink in favour of Reza Ghoochannejhad, who would eventually take care of the 2–2, which also turned out to be the final score.

For the second half of the 2022–23 season, Buitink was loaned by Fortuna Sittard.

Career statistics

References

2000 births
Living people
People from Nijkerk
Association football forwards
Dutch footballers
Netherlands youth international footballers
Eredivisie players
Tweede Divisie players
Derde Divisie players
SBV Vitesse players
PEC Zwolle players
Fortuna Sittard players
Footballers from Gelderland